Sembcorp Energy India Limited (SEIL) is a leading independent power producer (IPP) in India. Formerly known as Thermal Powertech Corporation India Limited, SEIL owns 100% of both Sembcorp Gayatri Power Limited and Sembcorp Green Infra Limited.

Overview
Sembcorp Energy India Ltd. (SEIL) is an independent power company in India. Sembcorp has a track record of identifying, developing and operating power generation assets across the thermal and renewable power sectors in India. It has a portfolio of thermal and renewable energy assets totalling approx. 4.77 gigawatts capacity in operation and under construction across multiple states in India.

Sembcorp Energy India Limited is part of the Sembcorp Industries (SCI) Group. Sembcorp has a balanced energy portfolio of over 12,700MW, with more than 3,200MW of renewable energy capacity comprising solar, wind and energy storage globally. Sembcorp also has been putting up urban developments, with a project portfolio spanning over 11,000 hectares across Asia. Listed on the main board of the Singapore Exchange, SCI is a component stock of the Straits Times Index, several MSCI and FTSE indices, as well as the SGX Sustainability Leaders Index and the Dow Jones Sustainability Asia Pacific Index.

Sembcorp Green Infra 
Sembcorp Green Infra is a renewable energy company that generates power and currently operating in India. Sembcorp Green Infra is a wholly owned subsidiary of Sembcorp Energy India Limited.

In 2015, Sembcorp acquired a majority stake in one of India's leading renewable energy firms, since renamed Sembcorp Green Infra. In August 2017, Sembcorp entered into an agreement to acquire IDFC Private Equity Fund III's remaining stake in Sembcorp Green Infra.

As of 2020 Sembcorp Green Infra's business consists of more than 2100 megawatts of wind and solar power assets in operation and under development in seven states across the southern, western and central regions of India. It includes 35 wind energy and 4 solar energy assets.

Sembcorp holds the distinction of being the first independent power producer to complete a SECI auction wind power project ahead of schedule, and as on date has the largest generating capacity commissioned from SECI wind auctions. The company also has a self-operating capacity of more than 600 MW, the largest with any independent power producer in the renewable sector in India.

See also 
Solar power in India

References 

Companies based in New Delhi
Renewable energy companies of India